Xu Si (born 24 January 1998) is a Chinese professional snooker player.

Career
Xu Si first started playing snooker aged 12 at his local club in Jieyang during the school holidays. After a few weeks he became determined to become a snooker player.

Prior to turning professional, Xu began playing in minor-ranking Asian Players Tour Championship from age 15, and his first appearance at a ranking event was in the wildcard round of the 2014 Shanghai Masters where he was whitewashed 5-0 by Ryan Day. He also made a wildcard appearance at the 2016 World Open where he defeated veteran James Wattana 5-3 or progress to the last 64, where he lost in the next round against Daniel Wells. He made a further appearance at the 2016 Shanghai Masters wildcard round where he lost 5–1 to Michael Holt. He then won two matches at the 2016 International Championship, defeating professionals Wang Yuchen at the wildcard stage, and two-time world champion Mark Williams in the last 64 before losing to Wattana in the last 32. He lost out in the first round of qualifying for the 2017 World Snooker Championship, losing 10–5 to Rod Lawler.

In August 2016 Xu won the 2016 IBSF World Under-21 Snooker Championship by defeating Alexander Ursenbacher 6-5 after being 5-3 down. This victory earned him a two-year World Snooker Tour card.

2017/2018 season

Xu's first professional match was in qualifying for the Riga Masters where he lost 4–2 to Robbie Williams. However, in only his third tournament, the 2017 Indian Open, he beat Michael Georgiou, Robin Hull, Sean O'Sullivan, Ricky Walden and Dave Gilbert to reach the semi-final, where he lost to John Higgins 4–2.

Xu reached the 2nd round of the UK Championship beating Mark Davis 6–5, and also reached the 4th round of the Scottish Open and 3rd round of the Welsh Open. In the World Championship, he lost the first match to Chris Wakelin 10–4. Xu finished the season ranked 91, but was awarded the title 'Rookie of the Year'.

2018/2019 season

Xu's second season saw a loss of form. He won only 6 matches and failed to win back-to-back matches in any tournament. His best win was a highly emotional match against Martin Gould in the China Championship qualifying round, which he won 5–4 on the final black. This result allowed him to play in the main event in Guangzhou, close to his hometown of Jieyang, allowing his relatives to see him play professional snooker for the first time. However, he lost to Noppon Saengkham.

In the World Championship Xu produced a magnificent display of scoring to beat Sean O'Sullivan, scoring ten 50+ breaks in successive frames to win the match 10–2. However, he could not repeat this form against Graeme Dott, losing 10–4. His ranking of 77 meant that he was relegated from the tour.

In May 2019, Xu Si came through Q-School - Event 1 by winning five matches to earn a two-year card on the World Snooker Tour for the 2019–20 and 2020–21 seasons.

2019/2020 season

Xu's third season was similar to his second, winning only 4 matches. It came to a premature end when the COVID-19 outbreak forced the suspension of the season. Xu returned to China and did not return for the resumption in July 2020, thereby missing the World Championship. His final ranking was 110.

2020/2021 season

For his fourth season, Xu made some technical changes, adopting the 'Sight Right' method. He also moved to the newly opened Ding Junhui Academy in Sheffield. His results were more consistent, reaching the 3rd round in the UK Championship and the English Open.

In World Championship qualification, Xu needed to win his first match to renew his professional tour card via the 1-year ranking list. His opponent was 7-times World Champion Stephen Hendry, in the third match of his comeback. After a nervous start, Xu won the last 6 frames of the match, with five 50+ breaks, to win 6–1. In the next round he came close to beating top seed Zhou Yuelong, but lost 6–5. He finished the season ranked 77.

Personal life

During the season, Xu Si lives in Sheffield. In the years 2017-20 he was based at the Victoria Snooker Academy, before moving to the Ding Junhui Snooker Academy in 2020. He has been described as one of the hardest workers on tour. Aside from snooker, Xu enjoys movies and playing computer games. Xu shares his birthday with fellow Chinese snooker player, Zhou Yuelong.

Performance and rankings timeline

Notes

Career finals

Amateur finals: 1 (1 title)

References

External links

Xu Si at worldsnooker.com
Xu Si at CueTracker.net: Snooker Results and Statistic Database
Profile on Snooker.org

1998 births
Living people
Chinese snooker players
21st-century Chinese people